James Trotman  (born 16 February 1979) is a British tennis player who retired early from tennis due to ongoing injuries.

Trotman was born in Ipswich in 1979 and originally played tennis at his local club, Sproughton Tennis Club.

As a junior player he was world-class and won 1995 Wimbledon Championships boys doubles with Martin Lee and 1997 Australian Open boys doubles with David Sherwood. He and Lee did also make one main draw appearance in the Senior Wimbledon doubles championship, in 1997. They lost in the first round to Henrik Holm and Nils Holm, 4–6, 6–3, 3–6.

Persistent injuries prevented him from making an impact at senior professional level. His career-high ATP doubles ranking was World No. 810.  (He never earned any singles ranking points.)

After he retired as a player Trotman moved into coaching. Among the people he has worked with are Anne Keothavong, Kyle Edmund and Naomi Cavaday. Kyle Edmund won the Levene Gouldin & Thompson Tennis Challenger in Binghamton, US, the Hong Kong ATP Challenger and qualifiers to gain entrance into 2 Grand Slams under Trotman.

Junior Grand Slam finals

Doubles: 3 (2 titles, 1 runner-up)

References

External links
 

Living people
1979 births
Australian Open (tennis) junior champions
English male tennis players
Wimbledon junior champions
British male tennis players
Tennis people from Suffolk
Grand Slam (tennis) champions in boys' doubles